Clifton Bridge is a road bridge spanning the River Trent and carrying the A52 road to the west of the city of Nottingham, in the county of Nottinghamshire, England.

It was completed and opened to traffic in March 1958 and is constructed of pre-stressed concrete. It is the next upstream road crossing from the older famous Trent Bridge. Clifton Bridge was initially built to relieve traffic pressures on Trent Bridge.

The current west bridge over the Trent at Clifton Bridge includes a section of the former B680 (which followed the route into Nottingham now used by the A453). The 275 ft bridge was formally opened on 5 June 1958 by Princess Alexandra, The Honourable Lady Ogilvy. At the time it was the longest pre-stressed concrete bridge in the country.

With the addition of the east bridge the crossing became dual-carriageway as the A614 as part of a  £3.2 million section (equivalent to £ in ),, opening in 1972.  The eight lane bridge is a part of major regional route linking Derby and Grantham as well as serving local traffic in Nottingham.

The bridge is also open to segregated pedestrian and cycle traffic.

In 1994 a survey revealed corrosion damage to up to 25% of the pre-stressing wires.  The bridge was strengthened by post-stressing with additional external cables.

In February 2020 during routine maintenance work, it was discovered that water damage had corroded steelwork under the bridge. This caused a temporary closure of the east bridge, which carries all eastbound traffic and one lane of westbound traffic, while the bridge was repaired.
By the end of 2021, the bridge had fully reopened to all road traffic, due to the repairs being completed.

General references

Bridges in Nottingham
Bridges across the River Trent
Bridges completed in 1958